Dasylirion is a genus of North American plants in the asparagus family, all native to Mexico, with the ranges of three species also extending into the south-western United States. In the APG III classification system, it is placed in the family Asparagaceae, subfamily Nolinoideae (formerly the family Ruscaceae).

Dasylirion is dioecious, with male and female flowers on separate plants.

Species

Formerly placed here
Nolina bigelovii (Torr.) S.Watson  (as D. bigelovii Torr.)

References

Flora of North America: Dasylirion
Bogler, D. J. (1995). Systematics of Dasylirion: taxonomy and molecular phylogeny. Bol. Soc. Bot. México 56: 69–76.

External links

 
Asparagaceae genera
Taxa named by Joseph Gerhard Zuccarini
Dioecious plants